Jason Cairns is a retired American soccer forward who played professionally in the USISL A-League

Cairns grew up playing for Jersey Shore Boca youth teams.  In 1994, he entered Trenton State College where he was a 1995 NSCAA Division III Second Team All American soccer player.  The College was renamed The College of New Jersey in 1996.  That season, Cairns and his 
Team mates won the NCAA Division III Men's Soccer Championship and Cairns was selected as an NSCAA Division III First Team All American. In 1997, he was again named to the Division III First Team and was the 1997 NSCAA Division III Player of the Year.

In 1998, the Cincinnati Riverhawks selected Cairns in the second round (32nd overall) of the 1998 A-League Draft.  In 1998, he was Second Team All League.  In 2000, Cairns moved to the New Jersey Stallions of the USL D-3 Pro League where he spent two seasons.

In December 1997, the Philadelphia KiXX drafted Cairns in the first round of the National Professional Soccer League.  However, Cairns never played indoor soccer professionally.

References

Living people
American soccer players
Cincinnati Riverhawks players
New Jersey Stallions players
A-League (1995–2004) players
USL Second Division players
Association football forwards
Year of birth missing (living people)